Mirandia is a monotypic genus of Paraguayan jumping spiders containing the single species, Mirandia australis. It was first described by H. D. Badcock in 1932, and is only found in Paraguay.

References

Invertebrates of Paraguay
Monotypic Salticidae genera
Salticidae
Spiders of South America